Zir Anay-e Olya (also Romanized as Zīr ‘Anāy-e ‘Olyā; also known as Zīr ‘Anā’-e Baj) is a village in Rostam-e Yek Rural District, in the Central District of Rostam County, Fars Province, Iran. At the 2006 census, its population was 53, in 11 families.

References 

Populated places in Rostam County